Spain competed at the 2013 World Aquatics Championships in Barcelona, Catalonia, Spain between 19 July and 4 August 2013 as the host nation.

Medalists

Diving

Spain qualified 5 quota places for the following diving events.

Men

Women

Open water swimming

Spain qualified five quota places for the following events in open water swimming:

Swimming

Spanish swimmers achieved qualifying standards in the following events (up to a maximum of 2 swimmers in each event at the A-standard entry time, and 1 at the B-standard):

Men

Women

Synchronized swimming

Spain qualified 12 quota places for each of the following synchronized swimming events.

Water polo

Men's tournament

Team roster

Iñaki Aguilar
Ricard Alarcón
Ruben de Lera
Albert Español
Pere Estrany
Xavier García
Daniel López

Marc Minguell
Guillermo Molina
Alberto Munarriz
Felipe Perrone
Balázs Szirányi
Xavier Vallès

Group play

Round of 16

Quarterfinal

5th–8th place semifinal

Fifth place game

Women's tournament

Team roster

Marta Bach
Andrea Blas
Anna Espar
Laura Ester
Maica García Godoy
Patricia Herrera
Laura López

Ona Meseguer
Lorena Miranda
Matilde Ortiz
Jennifer Pareja
Pilar Peña Carrasco
Roser Tarragó

Group play

Round of 16

Quarterfinal

Semifinal

Final

References

External links
Barcelona 2013 Official Site
Real Federación Española de Natación 

Nations at the 2013 World Aquatics Championships
2013 in Spanish sport
Spain at the World Aquatics Championships